Mileștii Mici is a Moldovan wine producer located in the commune of Mileștii Mici.

Cellars 
The State Enterprise Quality Wines Industrial Complex "Mileștii Mici" was founded in 1969 to store, preserve and mature high-quality wines.

Local ancient underground galleries reach the Chişinău borders. The limestone in the galleries maintains constant humidity (85–95%) and temperature throughout the year. The longer some specific red wines are stored in such ideal conditions, the more they improve. Some wines are cellared for several decades before being sold.

In August 2005, Mileștii Mici was registered in the Guinness World Records as the biggest wine collection in the world.
Overall, the complex holds nearly 2 million bottles. More than 70% of the stored wines are red, 20% are white and about 10% are dessert wines. The most valuable items of this collection, worth €480 a bottle, were produced in 1973–74; they are now exported only to Japan.

Wines are exported from Mileștii Mici to Sweden, Japan, the USA, Great Britain, the Czech Republic, Poland, Greece, Germany, Denmark, Finland, and China.

Wines 
The wines stored here are made from crops of various years, beginning with 1969. Grapes include Pinot, Traminer, Muscat, Riesling, Dnestrovscoie, Milestscoie, Codru, Negru de Purcari, Trandafirul Moldovei, Auriu, and Cahor-Ciumai.

References

External links 
  

Wineries of Moldova
Moldovan brands
Wineries of the Soviet Union
Agricultural organizations based in the Soviet Union
Moldovan wine